Zeuzera is an Old World genus of moths belonging to the family Cossidae.

Species
Zeuzera biebingeri Speidel et Speidel, 1986
Zeuzera lineata Gaede, 1933
Zeuzera multistrigata Moore, 1881
Zeuzera nepalense Daniel, 1962
Zeuzera nuristanensis Daniel, 1964 
Zeuzera pyrina (Linnaeus, 1761)
Zeuzera qinensis Hua, Chou, Fang et Chen, 1990 
Zeuzera yuennani Daniel, 1940

Former species
Zeuzera ariana Grum-Grshimailo, 1899
Zeuzera coffeae Nietner, 1861
Zeuzera conferta Walker, 1856
Zeuzera indica Herrich-Schaeffer, 1854
Zeuzera innotata Walker, 1865
Zeuzera nubila Staudinger, 1895
Zeuzera rhabdota Jordan, 1932
Zeuzera stigmatica Moore, 1879

References

 , 2004: Cossidae of Thailand. Part 1. (Lepidoptera: Cossidae). Atalanta 35 (3-4): 335-351.
 , 2009: Little known species of Palaearctic and Oriental Cossidae (Lepidoptera). IV. Phragmacossia ariana (Grum-Grshimailo, 1899), comb. n. Amurian zoological journal I (1): 55. Full article: .
 , 2009: The Carpenter Moths (Lepidoptera:Cossidae) of Vietnam. Entomofauna Supplement 16: 11-32.

External links
Zeuzera at funet

Zeuzerinae